United Nations Security Council Resolution 2615 was adopted on 22 December 2021. According to the resolution, the Security Council demands that humanitarian access for Afghan people. It also calls on all parties for respect human rights.

UN agency UNICEF warned of Afghanistan in a disruptions for food crisis.

See also

 List of United Nations Security Council Resolutions 2601 to 2700 (2021–present)

References

External links
Text of the Resolution at undocs.org

 2615
December 2021 events
2021 in Afghanistan
 2615